Buldhana Lok Sabha constituency (formerly, Buldana Lok Sabha constituency) is one of the 48 Lok Sabha (parliamentary) constituencies of Maharashtra state in western India. This constituency largely represents  Buldhana district in the Lok Sabha of Indian parliament, except Malkapur Assembly constituency, which is part of Raver Lok Sabha constituency from Jalgaon district of Khandesh region.

Assembly segments
Presently, after the implementation of the Presidential notification on delimitation on 19 February 2008, Buldhana Lok Sabha constituency comprises six Vidhan Sabha (legislative assembly) segments. These segments with constituency numbers and reservation (if any) are:

Members of Parliament

^ - bypoll
NCJ

Election results

General elections 2019

General elections 2014

General elections 2009

See also
 Buldhana district
 Akola Lok Sabha constituency (1951 elections as Buldhana Akola Lok Sabha constituency electing two seats)
 Khamgaon Lok Sabha constituency (1962 - 1967 - 1971 elections )
 List of Constituencies of the Lok Sabha

Notes

External links
Buldhana lok sabha  constituency election 2019 results details

Lok Sabha constituencies in Maharashtra
Buldhana district